The 2018 Fred Page Cup was the 24th Canadian Eastern Junior A Ice Hockey Championship for the Canadian Junior Hockey League. The Ottawa Jr. Senators hosted for the second time in team history. The tournament was held May 2 to May 6 at Jim Durrell Recreation Centre in Ottawa, Ontario. The tournament champions qualified for the 2018 Royal Bank Cup, held in Chilliwack, BC and hosted by the BCHL's Chilliwack Chiefs at the Prospera Centre.

Teams
Ottawa Jr. Senators (Host and CCHL Champions)
Regular season: 46-9-2-5 (1st CCHL Yzerman Division)
Playoffs: Defeated Pembroke Lumber Kings 4-2, Defeated Brockville Braves 4-3, Defeated Carleton Place Canadians 4-1 to win the league.

Carleton Place Canadians (CCHL Runner-up)
Regular Season: 53-5-1-3 (1st CCHL Robinson Division)
Playoffs: Defeated Rockland Nationals 4-1, Defeated Hawkesbury Hawks 4-0, Lost to Ottawa Jr. Senators 4-1.

Longueuil Collège Français (QJHL Champions)
Regular Season: 38-8-0-3 (1st LHJQ Martin St-Louis Division)
Playoffs: Defeated Montreal-Est Rangers 4-0, Defeated Granby Inouk 4-0, Defeated Terrebone Cobras 4-1 to win the league.

Edmundston Blizzard (MHL Champions)
Regular Season: 36-10-4-0 (1st MHL North Division)
Playoffs: Defeated Miramichi Timberwolves 4-0, Defeated Summerside Western Capitals 4-3, Defeated Yarmouth Mariners 4-2 to win league.

Tournament

Round Robin
x = Clinched championship round berth; y = Clinched first overall

Tie Breaker: Head-to-Head, then 3-way +/-.

Results

Semifinals and final

References
http://fredpagecup.pointstreaksites.com/view/fredpagecup/
http://themhl.ca/ MHL Website
http://www.lhjq.ca/fr/index.html QJHL Website
https://web.archive.org/web/20160419105827/http://centraljuniorhockeyleague.ca/view/centraljuniorhockeyleague CCHL Website

2017–18 in Canadian ice hockey
Fred Page Cup